Leshtani (also Romanized as Leshtānī; also known as Lash Dānī) is a village in Moqam Rural District, Shibkaveh District, Bandar Lengeh County, Hormozgan Province, Iran. At the 2006 census, its population was 20, in 4 families.

References 

Populated places in Bandar Lengeh County